İstanbul Büyükşehir Belediyespor, shortly İstanbul BBSK or İBBSK, are the men's volleyball department of İstanbul Büyükşehir Belediyespor, a multi-sport club based in Istanbul, Turkey. The team currently play in the Turkish Men's Volleyball League.

Honours

European competitions
 CEV Challenge Cup
 Semi-Finals (1): 2013–14
 BVA Cup
 Winners (2): 2008, 2012

Domestic competitions
 Turkish Men's Volleyball League
 Winners (1): 2008–09

External links
 

Istanbul Büyükşehir Belediyespor
Volleyball clubs established in 1991
Volleyball clubs in Istanbul
1991 establishments in Turkey